Gerald Stober (born 27 June 1969) is a South African former football (soccer) striker.

International career
He made his international debut on 22 November 1995 against Zambia as a substitute for Donald Khuse in the 60th minute. He played his last international on 24 April 1996 in a 3-2 loss to Brazil after coming in for Shaun Bartlett.

After retirement
He works as a Consultant at Alacrity, an Information Technology in the Century City area. He also works as a pundit for UEFA Champions League matchdays on E.tv.

References

1969 births
Living people
Association football forwards
South African soccer players
Santos F.C. (South Africa) players
South Africa international soccer players
Hellenic F.C. players
Sportspeople from Cape Town